Nodar Pilia was Minister of Culture of Abkhazia in the early 1990s.

References

Ministers for Culture of Abkhazia